The Embassy Theatre is a performance theater located in the downtown mall of Cumberland, Maryland at 49 Baltimore St. The theater mounts live performances of classic theatre fare such as Kurt Weill's Threepenny Opera and Kander and Ebb's Cabaret, as well as lesser-known work such as "The Mystery of Irma Vep" and "The Lady In Question," original works and local historical plays.  Other entertainment presented at the theatre includes movies and musical concerts. Originally opened as a movie theater in 1931, it then became a curtain and drapery store, and finally was remodeled to a live performance theater and allied arts venue. Until December 2014, the theatre was operated as the New Embassy Theatre. Recently remodeled, it now operates as the Embassy Theatre.

The Embassy was designed by architects Hodgens and Hills in the Art Deco style. The building features prominent fluted pilasters, topped with finials illuminated with neon. The theater is a major contributing feature of the Downtown Cumberland Historic District.

References

External links
 official website: https://embassytheatrecorp.org/
 Facebook page: https://www.facebook.com/embassytheatrecumberland/

Downtown Cumberland, Maryland
Theatres in Maryland
Culture of Cumberland, MD-WV-PA
Buildings and structures in Cumberland, Maryland
Theatre companies in Maryland
Tourist attractions in Allegany County, Maryland
1931 establishments in Maryland
Art Deco architecture in Maryland